Chris Mayer (born 17 March 1968) is a British former field hockey player who competed in the 1996 Summer Olympics.

References

External links
 

1968 births
Living people
British male field hockey players
Olympic field hockey players of Great Britain
Field hockey players at the 1996 Summer Olympics
1990 Men's Hockey World Cup players